NCIS: Hawaii is an American police procedural  television series that premiered on CBS on September 20, 2021. It stars Vanessa Lachey as Jane Tennant, the Special Agent in Charge of a fictional team of special agents from the Naval Criminal Investigative Service based in Hawaii. The show is a spin-off of the long-running series NCIS and the fourth series in the NCIS franchise. The series was created by Christopher Silber, Jan Nash, and Matt Bosack who also serve as writers and executive producers alongside Larry Teng who directed multiple episodes. The series also stars Alex Tarrant, Noah Mills, Yasmine Al-Bustami, Jason Antoon, Tori Anderson and Kian Talan. In March 2022, the series was renewed for a second season which premiered on September 19, 2022. In February 2023, the series was renewed for a third season.

Premise
The series follows a fictional team of the Naval Criminal Investigative Service agents who work out of the Pearl Harbor Field Office, which is led by Special Agent in Charge Jane Tennant. The team Investigates crimes related to the military and national security.

Cast

Main
 Vanessa Lachey as Jane Tennant: The first female Special Agent-in-Charge of the NCIS: Hawaiʻi Field Office.
Ronda Kahana Williams as young Jane Tennant.
 Alex Tarrant as Kai Holman: A new NCIS agent on the team who recently returned home to care for his father.
 Noah Mills as Jesse Boone: Tennant's confidant and second-in-command, Boone is a former homicide detective in Washington, DC, who knows the islands' hiking trails well.
 Yasmine Al-Bustami as Lucy Tara:  The junior field agent of NCIS: Hawaiʻi, and Whistler's love-interest turned girlfriend.
 Jason Antoon as Ernie Malik: NCIS: Hawaiʻi's cyber intelligence specialist
 Tori Anderson as Kathrine Marie "Kate"  Whistler: a Defense Intelligence Agency (DIA) Officer, later Federal Bureau of Investigation (FBI). Special Agent and NCIS-FBI liaison. Tara's love interest-turned-girlfriend.
 Kian Talan as Alex Tennant: Jane's eldest child.

Recurring
 Enver Gjokaj as Captain Joe Milius: Deputy Chief of Staff to Commander, Pacific Fleet, later reassigned to the Pentagon. He is also Jane's love interest; when his transfer was official, the two finally consummated their relationship.
 Mahina Napoleon as Julie Tennant: Jane's youngest child.
 Julie White as Maggie Shaw: Jane's former mentor and friend.
 Sharif Atkins as Captain Norman 'Boom Boom' Gates
 Seana Kofoed as Commander (Dr.) Carla Chase, a medical examiner assigned to Joint Base Pearl Harbor–Hickam.

Notable guests
 Beulah Koale as David Sola: A New Zealand intelligence specialist.

Crossover

NCIS 

 Wilmer Valderrama as Nick Torres: NCIS Special Agent who shares a past with Tennant.   
 Katrina Law as Jessica Knight: NCIS Special Agent.   
 Diona Reasonover as Kasie Hines: Forensic Specialist for NCIS.   
 Gary Cole as Alden Parker: NCIS Supervisory Special Agent of the MCRT. 
 Brian Dietzen as Dr. Jimmy Palmer, Chief Medical Examiner for NCIS.

NCIS: Los Angeles 
 Chris O'Donnell as Grisha "G." Callen, NCIS Supervisory Special Agent of the Office of Special Projects in Los Angeles
 LL Cool J as Sam Hanna, NCIS Senior Field Agent, Second in Command of the OSP

Episodes

Production

Development

On February 16, 2021, anonymous sources told The Hollywood Reporter that deals were being finalized on a potential fourth series in the NCIS franchise, titled NCIS: Hawaii, as it neared a straight-to-series order from CBS. They also said that series would be created and executive-produced by Christopher Silber, Jan Nash, and Matt Bosack, with Silber and Nash also serving as co-showrunners. Unlike the other series in the franchise, it is not planned to start with a backdoor pilot within another series. The series location would also create potential crossover opportunities with CBS's other Hawaii-based drama, Magnum P.I. NCIS: Los Angeles previously crossed over with Magnum P.I.s now concluded sister series, Hawaii Five-0, in 2012. The sources also said that the producers had already started looking for a director for a pilot and were working on hiring writers.

In early April 2021, it was reported that the series was expected to be picked up for the 2021–22 television season. On April 23, 2021, CBS officially ordered NCIS: Hawaii to series. Larry Teng was also announced to be executive producing the pilot episode. Bosack, Nash, and Silber wrote the pilot episode for the series. The series name was also officially changed to NCIS: Hawaii, adding an ʻokina in an effort to reflect the official spelling used in the Hawaiian language. On October 11, 2021, CBS picked up the series for a full season. On January 3, 2022, it was announced that a crossover with the nineteenth season of parent series NCIS would be taking place on March 28, 2022. Showrunners of both series had previously mentioned crossing over and CBS Entertainment President Kelly Kahl had stated that discussion about a crossover would start after NCIS: Hawaiʻi finished its first batch of episodes. On March 31, 2022, CBS renewed the series for a second season which premiered on September 19, 2022. The second season contained two further crossovers, the first once more with NCIS and the second with both NCIS and NCIS: Los Angeles. On February 21, 2023, CBS renewed the series for a third season.

Casting
On April 7, 2021, it was reported that CBS was looking to cast a female lead for the NCIS: Hawaii making it the first series in the franchise to do so. The character for the female lead was tentatively named Jane Tennant, and casting for the role as well as other principal characters began around the same time. On April 30, 2021, it was announced that Vanessa Lachey was the first to be cast as a series regular, in the role of Jane Tennant. Meanwhile, Yasmine Al-Bustami and Jason Antoon were also cast as series regulars to portray Lucy and Ernie, respectively. It was later announced that Noah Mills had joined the cast as Jesse. Tori Anderson and Kian Talan were cast as series regulars in the roles of Kate Whistler and Alex. On July 8, 2021, Alex Tarrant joined the main cast as Kai and  Enver Gjokaj was announced to be recurring as Joe Milius.

Former Hawaii Five-0 star Beulah Koale was cast as a guest star in the series' first two-part story. NCIS stars Wilmer Valderrama and Katrina Law, the latter of whom also starred on Hawaii Five-0, appeared as their NCIS characters in a crossover event. Gary Cole and Diona Reasonover also appeared as their NCIS characters in the crossover event.

Filming
The series is planned to use the production facilities built for Hawaii Five-0, which concluded in 2020. For the pilot episode, Larry Teng served as the director while and Yasu Tanida provided cinematography work. Filming for the series began at an undisclosed location on the North Shore of Oahu with a traditional Hawaiian blessing on June 16, 2021. Two days later on June 18, filming took place at Joint Base Pearl Harbor–Hickam. Both the first and second episodes had concluded filming by July 22.

On January 25, 2022, both Koale and Tarrant performed a haka on the NCIS Hawaii office film set to honor the work the crew has done in filming for the first season. The first season concluded filming on March 19, 2022.

Release
CBS announced its fall broadcast schedule on May 19, 2021, for the 2021–22 television season, with the new series on Mondays at 10:00 PM ET, immediately following parent series NCIS. The first teaser trailer was released on the same date featuring Lachey speaking about the premise and her role on the series. On July 12, 2021, CBS announced a series premiere date of September 20, 2021. TVLine released exclusive first look promotional photos from the series three days later on July 15. A second teaser trailer was released in August 2021, featuring a joint promo with NCIS. The series' twelfth episode, "Spies, Part 1", aired after the AFC Divisional Playoff Game on January 23, 2022, with "Spies, Part 2" airing the following day in the series' regular timeslot.

Reception

Critical response 
On Metacritic the series has a score of 48% based on reviews from 6 critics, indicating "mixed or average reviews". On Rotten Tomatoes season one has an approval rating of 60% based on reviews from 5 critics.
Caroline Framke of Variety gave the premiere a positive review and wrote: "The show still feels of a piece with 'NCIS' proper, military jargon, efficient dialogue, flashy mysteries and all. If you're already a fan, it's worth giving a shot. If not, there are plenty of other shows in the sea."

Ratings

Season 1 

†These DVR ratings are based on Live + Three Day rating results

Season 2

References

External links
 
 

2020s American crime drama television series
2020s American police procedural television series
2021 American television series debuts
American action television series
American television spin-offs
American military television series
English-language television shows
CBS original programming
NCIS (franchise)
Television series by CBS Studios
Television shows filmed in Hawaii
Television shows set in Hawaii
Fictional portrayals of the Honolulu Police Department